Arrhenosphaera is a fungal genus in the family Ascosphaeraceae. This is a monotypic genus, containing the single species Arrhenosphaera craneae.

References

External links
 

Monotypic Eurotiomycetes genera
Onygenales
Taxa described in 1974